Jorge Matías Araya Pozo, (born 25 March 1996) is a Chilean footballer who plays as a midfielder for Primera B de Chile club Deportes Melipilla.

Club career
Product from Chilean giants Colo-Colo, Araya joined the club’s youth ranks aged 8. Two seasons later, in 2016, he was considered by coach José Luis Sierra and fully debuted in a 0–0 Copa Libertadores group stage draw with Atlético Mineiro as home, previously playing some minutes in the derby against Universidad Católica, won 3–0 by Colo-Colo.

After being loaned to Palestino from 2019 to 2021, in 2022 he left Colo-Colo and joined Deportes Melipilla in the Primera B de Chile.

Honours
Colo-Colo
 Primera División (2): 2015–A, 2017
 Copa Chile (1): 2016
 Supercopa de Chile (2): 2017, 2018

References

External links
 

1996 births
Living people
Chilean footballers
Chile youth international footballers
Segunda División Profesional de Chile players
Chilean Primera División players
Primera B de Chile players
Colo-Colo B footballers
Colo-Colo footballers
Club Deportivo Palestino footballers
Deportes Melipilla footballers
Association football midfielders